Pamplona Cathedral (Santa María de la Asunción) is a Roman Catholic church in the archdiocese of Pamplona, Spain. The current 15th century Gothic church replaced an older Romanesque one. Archaeological excavations have revealed the existence of another two earlier churches. The Neoclassical façade was designed by Ventura Rodríguez in 1783. It has a 13th-14th-century Gothic cloister that provides access to two other Gothic rooms: the Barbazan chapel and the refectory. The Mediaeval kings of Navarre were crowned and some also buried there. The Navarrese Cortes (Parliament) was held there during the early modern ages.

The invocation
Since its foundation the temple has been dedicated to the invocation of Santa María de la Asunción (Saint Mary of the Assumption), whose on every August, 15 is celebrated ever since as the own associated with the Episcopal Church. It is possible that, due to a metonymy phenomenon, the ownership of the building has been associated with the titular image of the temple, Santa María la Real.

The historian José Goñi Gaztambide -specialized in the episcopal history of the diocese of Pamplona- explains, in part, the matter by echoing the petition made in 1905 to the council by the chaplain, Mariano Arigita Lasa , a relevant figure who became archivist of the Navarra Provincial Council, the Pamplona City Council and the cathedral. Arigita had initially requested to return the "primitive title" of Santa María la Real de Pamplona. Goñi Gaztambide's reply read like this:

Following the Canonical Coronation of Santa María de Pamplona, on September, 21 of 1946 , "the title became popular Santa María la Real de Pamplona which does not mean that it was his true dedication."

The church

The site of the cathedral is the oldest part of the Roman Pompaelo. Archaeological excavations in 1994 have revealed streets and buildings from the 1st century BC. The oldest cathedral was demolished in 924 during the invasion of Abd-al-Rahman III, Caliph of Cordoba. During the reign of Sancho III (1004–1035) the church was reconstructed. That church was demolished from 1083 to 1097, and the Romanesque cathedral was built from 1100 to 1127. It collapsed in 1391, with only the façade remaining. The building of the current Gothic church began in 1394 and lasted to 1501. The floorplan is cruciform with ambulatory, a central nave and four shorter aisles, all covered by partially polycromed rib vault. The style is very influenced by French models.

The sculpture of the interior includes the sepulchre of Charles III of Navarre and spouse Eleanor of Castile, by Jehan Lome de Tournai (1419), and the image of Royal Saint Mary, a Romanesque woodcarved silverplated sculpture. The choir, with its Renaissance choir stalls (1541), is separated from the nave by a Gothic iron grating (1517). There was a Renaissance retable (1598) in the presbytery, now in the church of Saint Michael in Pamplona. In the lateral chapels there are two Gothic retables (c.1500, 1507); one Italian Renaissance retable (16th century); one late Renaissance retable (1610, polycromed in 1617); and five Baroque retables (1642, 1683, 1685).

The cloister

Probably, the most outstanding element of the cathedral is its 13th century cloister. As the temple, the style followed the French Gothic architecture, and the sculptural decoration is very rich. The door that gives access from the temple shows the Dormition of the Virgin, and at the mullion stands a 15th-century sculpture of the Virgin Mary. The Barbazan chapel—named after the Pamplonese bishop buried there, Arnaldo de Barbazán—is covered by a Gothic eight-rib vault. The so-called 'Precious Door' gives access to the ancient canons' dormitory and shows a complete sculptural story of the Virgin Mary's life. There are several notable burials: Bishop Miguel Sánchez de Asiáin's (14th century), Viceroy of Navarre Count of Gages' (Baroque, 18th century) and guerrilla fighter Francisco Espoz y Mina's (Neo-classical, 19th century). The lavatory is closed by a grid whose iron is said to be from the battle of Navas de Tolosa. Another decorated Gothic door gives access to the old kitchen and the refectory.

Diocesan Museum

The former canons' rooms house the Diocesan Museum. The main room is a 14th-century rib-vault covered refectory. The adjacent kitchen is covered by a pyramidal stone-built chimney. This museum exhibits pieces of religious art from the cathedral and from many other Navarrese churches, many of them abandoned today: Romanesque, Gothic, Renaissance and Baroque sculpture, Gothic and Baroque painting, and 13th to 18th centuries goldsmith and silversmith.

The most outstanding silversmith pieces are the Gothic Holy Sepulcher reliquary, made in 13th century Paris; the 14th century Lignum Crucis reliquary and the Renaissance 16th century processional monstrance.

References

Bibliography

 
 Arraiza, Jesús: Catedral de Pamplona: la otra historia, Pamplona: Ediciones y Libros, 1994

External links

 Cathedral of Pamplona's web page
 Catálogo monumental de Navarra:
 The temple
 Façade
 Juan de Anchieta's Crucified Christ
 Choir stalls
 Main retable, now in the church of Saint Michael of Pamplona
 Charles III's sepulcher
 The 'Precious Door'
 Holy Sepulcher reliquary
 Processional monstrance
The Art of medieval Spain, A.D. 500-1200, an exhibition catalog from The Metropolitan Museum of Art Libraries (fully available online as PDF), which contains material on Pamplona Cathedral (no. 96)

Roman Catholic cathedrals in Navarre
14th-century Roman Catholic church buildings in Spain
18th-century Roman Catholic church buildings in Spain
Gothic art
Renaissance sculptures
Baroque sculptures
Buildings and structures in Pamplona
Gothic architecture in Navarre
Neoclassical architecture in Navarre
Churches in Navarre
Burial sites of the Castilian House of Burgundy
Burial sites of the House of Évreux
Burial sites of the House of Champagne
Neoclassical church buildings in Spain